Olešná may refer to places:

Czech Republic
Olešná (Beroun District), a municipality and village in the Central Bohemian Region
Olešná (Havlíčkův Brod District), a municipality and village in the Vysočina Region
Olešná (Pelhřimov District), a municipality and village in the Vysočina Region
Olešná (Písek District), a municipality and village in the South Bohemian Region
Olešná (Rakovník District), a municipality and village in the Central Bohemian Region
Nová Olešná, a municipality and village in the South Bohemian Region

Slovakia
Olešná, Čadca, a municipality and village in the Žilina Region